Zihni Derin (1880–1965) was a Turkish agronomist and agriculturalist noted primarily for his pioneering role in tea production in Turkey's eastern Black Sea Region.

External links

 

Turkish educators
1880 births
1965 deaths
People from Muğla
Recipients of TÜBİTAK Service Award